Syana Tehsil ( Sayānā Tahasīl) is one of the seven tehsils (sub-districts) in district of Bulandshahar. Syana tehsil has 04 Census towns and 169 villages. The name of the tehsil is also written  as "Siana" or "Siyana". As per Delimitation order of 2008 by Election Commission of India, the name of the tehsil is "Syana".

Census towns
Syana Tehsil comprises four census towns. The biggest census town is Siana Nagar Palika Parishad (population of 44,415) and smallest is Bhawan Bahadur Nagar Nagar Panchayat (population of 10,188). Following is the list of all the towns along with the population as per 2011 census.
 Bhawan Bahadur Nagar Nagar Panchayat (10,188)
 Bugrasi Nagar Panchayat (14,992)
 Khanpur Nagar Panchayat (17,247)
 Siana Nagar Palika Parishad (44,415)
Siyana is also known for mangoes.

Villages
Syana Tehsil has 172 villages. Following is the list of all villages (along with village population as per 2011 Census) in Syana tehsil. 
 Abhaypur: (1,097)
 Akapur Riyana: (3,330)
 Alampur Nagla: (1,357)
 Alavas Baturi: (1,456)
 Amargarh: (8,912)
 Amarthal Urf Unchagaon: (6,560)
 Aurangabad Tahapur Bager: (3,607)
 B.B. Nagar: (128)
 Badshahpur Gadia: (1,039)
 Badshahpur Talab: (1,236)
 Bahainpur: (3,340)
 Bahedi Khera: (572)
 Bainipur: (2,074)
 Balipur: (1,816)
 Bamanpur Talluka: (1,174)
 Bansuri: (1,321)
 Barauli Basdevpur: (6,879)
 Barkatpur: (920)
 Basi Bangar: (3,768)
 Bathada Vajidpur: (3,009)
 Bhadaura: (1,603)
 Bhadoi Asarfpur: (231)
 Bhagawantpur: (1,427)
 Bhainsaura: (2,873)
 Bhamrauli: (1,001)
 Bhansa Khur: (3,528)
 Bharkau: (2,839)
 Bharra: (1,565)
 Bhatpura: (131)
 Bhaupur: (1,321)
 Bhirawti: (689)
 Bigraon: (2,863)
 Bihata: (2,613)
 Chandpur Poothi: (4,822)
 Chandyana: (6,910)
 Chasi: (1,545)
 Chatehra: (1,028)
 Chigrawati: (2,371)
 Chitsona Alipur: (6,799)
 Darauli: (1,082)
 Darveshpur: (29,29)
 Daulatpur Kalan: (7,998)
 Dehra: (2,732)
 Dhakauli: (1,796)
 Dhakka: (2,224)
 Dhakrauli: (3,850)
 Dhalna: (2,017)
 Dhaniyawali: (2,536)
 Dulkhara: (2,229)
 Eklaidi: (923)
 Emamabad: (1,520)
 Farida Bager: (3,735)
 Fatehpur Gujar: (231)
 Fatehpur: (783)
 Gasupur: (3,458)
 Ghansoorpur: (1,551)
 Ghunghraoli: (4,780)
 Ginaura Nagli: (2,695)
 Giraura: (6,460)
 Gulab Nagar: (50,50)
 Guraoli: (1,948)
 Hajipur: (4,985)
 Harwanpur Urf Bhagawanpur: (524)
 Hasanpur Ujarra: (204)
 Hingbara: (3,891)
 Ilna: (5,417)
 Ikladi (500)
 Imalia: (628)
 Ishanpur: (2,093)
 Jadaul: (7,139)
 Jadauli: (1,280)
 Jalalpur: (5,508)
 Jaria Alampur: (2,833)
 Jawasa: (3,854)
 Kachraut: (2,414)
 Kalyanpur: (989)
 Kamalpur: (3,463)
 Kanauna: (3,669)
 Kapsaipur: (3,742)
 Karaitha: (541)
 Karauthi: (1,135)
 Karethha: (212)
 Kariyari: (1,735)
 Kaura Shamshadbad: (2,357)
 Kesorpur Sathla: (4,121)
 Khad Mohan Nagar: (7,185)
 Khandoi: (2,279)
 Khanpur Majra: (2,092)
 Kharkali: (2,959)
 Kharpur: (1,036)
 Khijarpur: (917)
 Kisola: (1,908)
 Kriyawali: (2,730)
 Kuchesar: (10,252)
 Kurena: (2,009)
 Ladana: (2,760)
 Launga: (1,960)
 Madangarh: (709)
 Madona Jafrabad: (5,553)
 Maduhasan Garhi Bager: (409)
 Mahav: (2,224)
 Mahiuddinpur Bukalana: (4,057)
 Mahuddinpur: (393)
 Makri: (5,052)
 Mangalpur: (1,422)
 Mania Tikri: (2,168)
 Manpur: (729)
 Mathura Nagal: (1,053)
 Maua Khera: (2,175)
 Mavai: (2,542)
 Mirzapur Nagli: (662)
 Modh.Allipur Urf Nima Patty Al: (748)
 Mohamadpurbarwala: (1,922)
 Mullani: (2,324)
 Nagaur: (1,161)
 Nagla Madaripur: (1,269)
 Narendrapur: (3,136)
 Narsena: (3,312)
 Nehchauli: (1,298)
 Nikhob: (2,117)
 Nirsukha: (3,177)
 Nittyanandpur Nagli: (1,353)
 Nizampur Bager: (1,140)
 Pali Anandgarhi: (3,466)
 Pali: (181)
 Palipartapur: (2,607)
 Parawana Mahmudpur: (9,797)
 Pempur: (676)
 Pilkhani: (1,528)
 Pirpur: (428)
 Pota Kabulpur: (3,118)
 Pyana Kalan: (3,299)
 Pyana Khurd: (1,230)
 Raghunathpur: (1,764)
 Rahmatpur Augna: (1,113)
 Rampur/Pitampur: (387)
 Ranapur: (4,337)
 Rasulpur: (1,032)
 Ratanpur: (2,268)
 Rausla: (793)
 Ravani Katiri Bangar: (4,750)
 Sabdalpur: (1,089)
 Sahanpur: (7,487)
 Sahera: (1,190)
 Saidpur: (6,805)
 Salabad Dhamaira: (2,263)
 Saujna Rani: (1,129)
 Sega Jagatpur: (2,267)
 Seorampur: (1,012)
 Shadipur Banboi: (242)
 Shafi Nagar: (1,983)
 Shakarpur: (644)
 Shekhupura: (1,390)
 Sikri: (1,529)
 Sinhali Jhaya: (1,399)
 Siyana: (2,693)
 Sojna Jhaya: (2,460)
 Sulaila: (1,651)
 Surajpur Tikri: (2,652)
 Takrarpur Ladpor: (3,664)
 Tehgora: (550)
 Thalinayatpur: (2,385)
 Thana Gajraula: (3,288)
 Thauna: (3,268)
 Tibra: (1,121)
 Timarpur: (1,022)
 Teekampur: (850)
 Umarpur: (5,281)
 Verafirojpur: (7,880)
 Yunispur: (1,530)
 Banbhora (1,350)

Climate

See also 

 Bulandshahr district
 Syana (Assembly constituency)

References 

Bulandshahr district
Tehsils of Uttar Pradesh